Chimbela is a 1939 Argentine musical film drama directed by José A. Ferreyra. The film stars Floren Delbene and Armando Bo. It premiered in Buenos Aires.

External links

1939 films
1930s Spanish-language films
Argentine black-and-white films
Tango films
Films directed by José A. Ferreyra
1930s musical drama films
Argentine musical drama films
1939 drama films
1930s Argentine films